Singularity or singular point may refer to:

Science, technology, and mathematics

Mathematics
 Mathematical singularity, a point at which a given mathematical object is not defined or not "well-behaved", for example infinite or not differentiable

Geometry
 Singular point of a curve, where the curve is not given by a smooth embedding of a parameter
 Singular point of an algebraic variety, a point where an algebraic variety is not locally flat
 Rational singularity

Complex analysis
 Essential singularity, a singularity near which a function exhibits extreme behaviour
 Isolated singularity, a mathematical singularity that has no other singularities close to it
 Movable singularity, a concept in singularity theory
 Removable singularity, a point at which a function is not defined but at which it can be so defined that it is continuous at the singularity

Natural sciences
 Singularity (system theory), in dynamical and social systems, a context in which a small change can cause a large effect
 Gravitational singularity, in general relativity, a point in which gravity is so intense that spacetime itself becomes ill defined
 Initial singularity, a hypothesized singularity of infinite density before quantum fluctuations caused the Big Bang and subsequent inflation that created the Universe
 Penrose–Hawking singularity theorems, in general relativity theory, theorems about how gravitation produces singularities such as in black holes
 Prandtl–Glauert singularity, the point at which a sudden drop in air pressure occurs
 Singularity (climate), a weather phenomenon associated with a specific calendar date
 Van Hove singularity in the density of states of a material

Technology
 Singularity (operating system), an operating system developed by Microsoft Research written in managed code
 Mechanical singularity, a position or configuration of a mechanism or a machine where the subsequent behavior cannot be predicted
 Singularity (software), a container technology that does not require root permissions to run

Futurology
 Technological singularity, a hypothetical point in time at which the development of artificial general intelligence will make human civilization obsolete

Arts and entertainment

Film and television

 "Singularity", a first-season episode of Disney's So Weird
 "Singularity" (Star Trek: Enterprise), a second-season episode of Star Trek: Enterprise
 "The Singularity" (Agents of S.H.I.E.L.D.), a third-season episode of Agents of S.H.I.E.L.D.
 "Singularity", a first-season episode of Stargate SG-1
 The Singularity (film), a 2012 documentary about the technological singularity
Singularity (2017 film), American science fiction film starring John Cusack
 Singularity,  the working title for The Lovers, starring Josh Hartnett and Bipasha Basu
 Godzilla Singular Point, a 2021 Japanese anime surrounding Godzilla

Literature
 Singularity (Sleator novel), a 1985 science-fiction novel by William Sleator
 Singularity (DeSmedt novel), a 2004 novel by Bill DeSmedt
 Singularity (audio drama), a 2005 Doctor Who audio drama
 Singularity 7, a graphic novel by Ben Templesmith
 The Singularity Is Near, a 2005 book by Ray Kurzweil on the technological singularity
 Temporal singularity, or point of divergence, in speculative fiction

Music

Albums
 Singularity (Joe Morris album), 2001
 Singularity (Peter Hammill album), 2006
 Singularity (Mae album), 2007
 Singularity (Robby Krieger album), 2010
 Singularity (Northlane album), 2013
 Singularity (Jon Hopkins album), 2018
 Singularity, a 2014 EP by Lemaitre
 The Singularity (Phase I – Neohumanity), 2014 album by Swedish metal band Scar Symmetry

Songs
 "Singularity" (song), performed by V of the South Korean group BTS from their 2018 album Love Yourself: Tear
 "Singularity", by Jon Hopkins on the 2018 album Singularity
 "Singularity", by Caligula's Horse on the 2011 album Moments from Ephemeral City
 "Singularity", by Textures on the 2011 album Dualism
 "Singularity", by Born of Osiris on the 2011 album The Discovery
 "Singularity", by Steve Aoki & Angger Dimas featuring My Name Is Kay from It's the End of the World as We Know It, 2013
 "Singularity", by Tesseract on the 2013 album Altered State
 "Singularity", by New Order on the 2015 album Music Complete
 "Singularity", by Devin Townsend on the 2019 album Empath
 "The Singularity", by Doctor Steel on the 2002 album People of Earth

People
Singularity, stage name of Grey's Kyle Trewartha

Video games
 Singularity (video game), a 2010 video game developed by Raven Software
 Endgame: Singularity, a 2005 video game

Organizations
 Singularity University, a California Benefit Corporation part think-tank, part business incubator, based on Ray Kurzweil's theory of technological singularity
 Machine Intelligence Research Institute (MIRI), formerly "The Singularity Institute for Artificial Intelligence" (SIAI)
 Singularity Summit, its annual conference

See also
 Singular (disambiguation)